Roberto Demo (born 1965 in Turin) is an Italian jazz singer-songwriter and vocal teacher. During the 1990s he attended seminars of artists like Barney Kessel, Mick Goodrick, Scott Henderson, Jim Hall (musician), and vocal teacher Jo Estill, who played a key role in his development.

During his career he has recorded 2 albums (La porta, 2001, and Sono un bluff, 2005)), and played with several Italian and international artists, including Emanuele Cisi, Luigi Martinale, Jonathan Gee, Steve Rose, and Winston Clifford.

Discography 
La porta (2001)
Sono un bluff (2005)

External links
 Official website
 Short biography at Jazzitalia

1965 births
Living people
Musicians from Turin
Italian singer-songwriters